Henry Walter Burton (December 1876 – 23 November 1947) was a Conservative Party politician in the United Kingdom.

He was elected at the 1924 general election as Member of Parliament (MP) for the Sudbury constituency in Suffolk,  with a majority of 1 over the sitting Liberal MP John Frederick Loverseed.

Burton held the seat until his defeat at the 1945 general election by the Labour party candidate Roland Hamilton.

References

External links 
 

1876 births
1947 deaths
Conservative Party (UK) MPs for English constituencies
UK MPs 1924–1929
UK MPs 1929–1931
UK MPs 1931–1935
UK MPs 1935–1945